Paper Man is a 1971 American television film transmitted as one of the "Friday Night Movies" which CBS-TV was then including in its prime-time programming. It also had a brief theatrical run with a longer version. It was directed by Walter Grauman, and dramatized for television by James D. Buchanan and Ronald Austin, both of whom were working from a story written by Anthony Wilson. It starred Dean Stockwell, Stefanie Powers, James Stacy, James Olson, Elliott Street, and Tina Chen.

Plot
Four college students (Stefanie Powers, James Stacy, Elliott Street, and Tina Chen) take advantage of a credit card mistakenly issued to someone who does not exist by using their university's computer to counterfeit an entire identity and erase the charges they run up on it – done by Avery (Dean Stockwell), a computer wiz to fix everything for them. None of them count on the computer seeming to have some ideas of its own, or on it commencing to murder them.

Ultimately, a man employed at the university (James Olson) proves to have stolen the identity which the students had counterfeited and to have been using it to commit the offenses which the students had blamed on the computer.

Paper Man was produced at a time when identity theft was neither as common a crime, nor as difficult to commit, as it later became.

Cast
Dean Stockwell as Avery Jensen
Stefanie Powers as Karen McMillan
James Stacy as Jerry
Tina Chen as Lisa
Elliott Street as Joel Fisher
James Olson as Art Fletcher

References

External links
 

1971 television films
1971 films
American science fiction films
CBS network films
Films about computing
Films about identity theft
20th Century Fox Television films
Films directed by Walter Grauman
1970s science fiction films
1970s American films